Maurice Finkel may refer to:

 Moishe Finkel (died 1904), prominent figure in the early years of Yiddish theater
 Maurice Herman Finkel (1888–1949), Yiddish theater performer, who later became an architect